Kedzie Avenue is a major north–south street in Chicago, Illinois.

Both Kedzie streets in Chicago and suburban Evanston are named after John H. Kedzie, an early Chicago real-estate developer.

Between Palmer Street (2200 North) and Logan Boulevard (2600 North), Kedzie Avenue is part of Chicago's boulevard system and, as such, is signed as Kedzie Boulevard.

On its path through the city, Kedzie passes through the neighborhoods of (from south to north) Mount Greenwood, Ashburn, Chicago Lawn, Gage Park, Brighton Park, Little Village, Lawndale, East Garfield Park, Humboldt Park, Logan Square, Avondale, Irving Park, Albany Park, North Park and West Ridge, in addition to the suburbs of Olympia Fields, Flossmoor, Homewood, Hazel Crest, Markham, Posen, Midlothian, Robbins, Blue Island, Alsip, Merrionette Park, Evergreen Park, and Evanston.

Mass transit (CTA)
Bus Routes
 11 Lincoln
 52 Kedzie
 52A South Kedzie
 93 California/Dodge (Monday–Saturday only)

'L' Stations
 (Blue, O'Hare branch)
 (Blue, Congress branch)
 (Brown)
 (Green)
 (Orange)
 (Pink)

See also
Nabisco, the world's largest bakery on 7300 South Kedzie Avenue

References 

Streets in Chicago